Schlünz is a surname. Notable people with the surname include:
 
Annette Schlünz (born 1964), German musician and composer 
Juri Schlünz (born 1961), German footballer and coach